Hydrophobia or hydrophobe may refer to:

Science and medicine
 Aquaphobia, a psychological fear of water
 Hydrophobe, a term used in chemistry to describe chemical "aversions" of a molecule, or part of a molecule, to water
 Rabies, historically known as hydrophobia

Art, entertainment, and media
 Hydrophobia (video game), a 2010 game developed by Dark Energy Digital
 Hydrophobia, a Hungarian disk magazine (1996–1997)
"Hydrophobia", the 13th track on the Risk of Rain 2 soundtrack

See also
 List of phobias